The 2004 Big South Conference men's basketball tournament took place March 2–6, 2004, at campus sites. The tournament was won by the Liberty Flames, their second tournament win in school history. Liberty defeated High Point in the title game 89–44, although Danny Gathings of High Point won the tournament's Most Valuable Player.

Format
Eight of the conference's nine teams participated for the tournament, with Birmingham–Southern being ineligible. Teams were seeded by conference winning percentage. All games were hosted at campus sites, with home-field advantage going to the higher seed.

Bracket

* Asterisk indicates overtime game
Source

All-Tournament Team
Danny Gathings, High Point
Larry Blair, Liberty
Gabe Martin, Liberty
Zione White, High Point
K. J. Garland, UNC Asheville

References

Tournament
Big South Conference men's basketball tournament
Big South Conference men's basketball tournament
Big South Conference men's basketball tournament